The Warwolf, or War Wolf or Ludgar, is believed to be the largest trebuchet ever made. It was created in Scotland by order of King Edward I of England, during the siege of Stirling Castle, as part of the Scottish Wars of Independence.

Warwolf at Stirling
When disassembled, the weapon would fill 30 wagons in parts. It reportedly took five master carpenters and forty-nine other labourers at least three months to complete.

A contemporary account of the siege states, "During this business the king had carpenters construct a fearful engine called the loup-de-guerre [sic., War wolf], and this when it threw, brought down the whole wall."

Even before construction could be completed, Scottish soldiers offered surrender, fearing the weapon's potential to destroy the entire castle. Edward sent the truce party back inside the castle, declaring, "You do not deserve any grace, but must surrender to my will." Edward decided to carry on with the siege and witness the destructive power of the weapon.

In the original records
Some of the original parchment rolls of the accounts of King Edward survive. Two references to the War Wolf, in Latin read;
Domino Alexandro le Convers, pro denariis per ipsum datis,..., carpentariis facientibus ingenium quod vocatur Lupus Guerre, et aliis operaris diversis operantibus, ..., mensibus Maii et Junii anno presenti (1304), viio die Junii, ..., 10 s.To Master Alexander le Convers, for money paid by him to the carpenters making the engine called 'War Wolf', and other workers working (also on the engine), in May and June 1304, 10 shillings on 7 June 1304.Thome de Viridi Campo, valleto regine, de dono regis in recompensacionem laboris quem sustenit circa facturem Lupus Guerre quem rex fieri ordinavit pro insultu castri de Stryvelyn, ..., xl li."To Thomas of Viridis Campus (i.e. Greenfield), the queen's valet, recompensed at the King's hand for his labours in the making of the 'War Wolf', which the King ordered to be made to slight Stirling Castle, £40."

Another payment refers to a watchman; Reginald the Janitor was paid wages for guarding its beams for forty nights in June and July 1304.

References

Bain, Joseph, ed., Calendar of Documents relating to Scotland, vol. 4, HM Register House, Edinburgh, (1877)

External links

 Secrets of Lost Empires: Medieval Siege (building of and history of trebuchets), from the NOVA website
 An article on Trebuchet Mechanics (in PDF format)

Siege engines